Commercial Lunar Payload Services (CLPS) is a NASA program to contract transportation services able to send small robotic landers and rovers to the Moon's south polar region mostly with the goals of scouting for lunar resources, testing in situ resource utilization (ISRU) concepts, and performing lunar science to support the Artemis lunar program. CLPS is intended to buy end-to-end payload services between Earth and the lunar surface using fixed priced contracts. The program was extended to add support for large payloads starting after 2025.

NASA's Science Mission Directorate operates the CLPS program in conjunction with the Human Exploration and Operations and Space Technology Mission Directorates. NASA expects the contractors to provide all activities necessary to safely integrate, accommodate, transport, and operate NASA payloads, including launch vehicles, lunar lander spacecraft, lunar surface systems, Earth re-entry vehicles and associated resources. 

To date, eight missions have been contracted under the program (not counting one mission contract that was revoked after awarding).

History

NASA has been planning the exploration and use of natural lunar resources for many years. A variety of exploration, science, and technology objectives that could be addressed by regularly sending instruments, experiments and other small payloads to the Moon have been identified by NASA.

When the concept study on the Resource Prospector rover was cancelled in April 2018, NASA officials explained that lunar surface exploration will continue in the future, but using commercial lander services under a new CLPS program. Later that April, NASA launched the Commercial Lunar Payload Services program as the first step in the solicitation for flights to the Moon. In April 2018, CLPS issued a Draft Request for Proposal, and in September 2018 the actual CLPS Request for Proposal was issued. The text of the formal solicitation and selected contractors are here:

On 29 November 2018, NASA announced the first nine companies that will be allowed to bid on contracts, which are indefinite delivery, indefinite quantity contracts with a combined maximum contract value of $2.6 billion during the next 10 years.

In February 2018 NASA issued a solicitation for Lunar Surface Instrument and Technology Payloads that may become CLPS customers. Proposals were due by November 2018 and January 17, 2019. NASA makes yearly calls for proposals.

On May 31, 2019, NASA announced a list of awards, featuring Astrobotic, of Pittsburgh, Pa., $79.5 million; Intuitive Machines, of Houston, Texas, $77 million; and OrbitBeyond, $97 million; to launch their Moon landers. However, Orbit Beyond dropped out of this contract in July 2019 (with NASA acknowledging termination of contract on 29 July 2019), but remains a contractor able to bid on future missions.

On 1 July 2019, a US$5.6 million contract was awarded to Astrobotic and its partner Carnegie Mellon University to develop MoonRanger, a  rover to carry payloads on the Moon for NASA's CLPS. Launch is envisioned for either 2021 or 2022. The rover will carry science payloads yet to be determined and developed by other providers, that will focus on scouting and creating 3D maps of a polar region for signs of water ice or lunar pits for entrances to Moon caves. The rover would operate mostly autonomously for up to one week.

On 18 November 2019, NASA added five contractors to the group of companies eligible to bid to deliver large payloads to the lunar surface under the CLPS program: Blue Origin, Ceres Robotics, Sierra Nevada Corporation, SpaceX, and Tyvak Nano-Satellite Systems.

On 8 April 2020, NASA announced it had awarded the fourth (after Astrobotic's, Intuitive Machines' and OrbitBeyond's awards) CLPS contract for Masten Space Systems. The contract, worth US$75.9 million, is for Masten's XL-1 lunar lander to deliver payloads from NASA and other customers to the south pole of the Moon in late 2022.

On 11 June 2020 NASA awarded Astrobotic Technology its second CLPS contract. The mission will be the first flight of Astrobotic's larger Griffin lander, delivering NASA's VIPER resource prospecting lunar rover to the Lunar south pole. Griffin weighs 450 kg, the VIPER rover approximately 1,000 pounds (about 450 kg), and the award is for $199.5 M (this covers Griffin lander and launch costs too). The mission is scheduled for November 2024.

On 16 October 2020 NASA awarded Intuitive Machines their second CLPS contract for Intuitive Machines Mission 2 (IM-2). The contract was worth approximately $47 million. Using Nova-C lander, the mission will land a drill (PRIME-1) combined with a mass spectrometer to the Lunar south pole, to attempt harvesting ice from below the surface. The mission is scheduled for December 2022, using a Falcon 9 rocket.

On 4 February 2021, NASA awarded a CLPS contract to Firefly Aerospace, of Cedar Park, Texas, worth approximately US$93.3 million, to deliver a suite of 10 science investigations and technology demonstrations to the Moon in 2023 (later delayed to 2024). This was the sixth award (seventh if one counts the OrbitBeyond award that was later cancelled) for lunar surface delivery (that is, for a lunar lander) under the CLPS initiative. This was the first delivery awarded to Firefly Aerospace, which will provide the lunar delivery service using its Blue Ghost lander, which the company designed and developed at its Cedar Park facility.

The next (7th, not counting OrbitBeyond contract) CLPS contract was awarded by NASA on 17 November 2021 to Intuitive Machines, their 3rd award. Their Nova-C lander was contracted to land four NASA payloads (about 92 kg in total) to study a lunar feature called Reiner Gamma. The mission was known as IM-3 mission and was planned to land on the Moon in 2024. The contract value was $77.5 million and under the contract, Intuitive Machines was responsible for end-to-end delivery services, including payload integration, delivery from Earth to the surface of the Moon, and payload operations.

On July 21, 2022, NASA announced that it had awarded a CLPS contract (8th, not counting OrbitBeyond) worth $73 million to a team led by Draper. The mission targets Schrödinger Basin on the farside of the Moon and at the time was scheduled for 2025. The mission lander, called SERIES-2 by Draper, will deliver to Schrödinger Basin three experiments to collect seismic data, measure the heat flow and electrical conductivity of the lunar subsurface and measure electromagnetic phenomena created by the interaction of the solar wind and plasma with the lunar surface. This mission is the first CLPS mission to target the lunar farside, and aims to be the second landing of all time (after China's Chang’e-4) to the Moon's farside. The mission will also develop and deploy two data relay satellites, a must for missions in the lunar farside. Many companies are involved in the mission with Draper being the prime contractor.

Overview

The competitive nature of the CLPS program is expected to reduce the cost of lunar exploration, accelerate a robotic return to the Moon, sample return, resource prospecting in the south polar region, and promote innovation and growth of related commercial industries. The payload development program is called Development and Advancement of Lunar Instrumentation (DALI), and the payload goals are exploration, in situ resource utilization (ISRU), and lunar science. The first instruments are expected to be selected by Summer 2019, and the flight opportunities start in 2021.

Multiple contracts will be issued, and the early payloads will likely be small because of the limited capacity of the initial commercial landers. The first landers and rovers will be technology demonstrators on hardware such as precision landing/hazard avoidance, power generation (solar and RTGs), in situ resource utilization (ISRU), cryogenic fluid management, autonomous operations and sensing, and advanced avionics, mobility, mechanisms, and materials. This program requires that only US launch vehicles can launch the spacecraft.

The Draft Request for Proposal's covering letter states that the contracts will last up to 10 years. As NASA's need to send payloads to the lunar surface (and other cislunar destinations) arises it will issue Firm-Fixed Price 'task orders' that the approved prime contractors can bid for. A Scope Of Work will be issued with each task order. The CLPS proposals are being evaluated against five Technical Accessibility Standards.

NASA is assuming a cost of one million dollars per kilogram delivered to the lunar surface. (This figure may be revised after a lunar landing when the actual costs are available.)

Contractors

The companies selected are considered "main contractors" that can sub-contract projects to other companies of their choice. The first companies granted the right to bid on CLPS contracts were chosen in 2018.

On 21 May 2019, three companies were awarded lander contracts: Astrobotic Technology, Intuitive Machines, OrbitBeyond.

On 29 July 2019, NASA announced that it had granted OrbitBeyond's request to be released from this specific contract, citing "internal corporate challenges."

On 18 November 2019, NASA added five new contractors to the group of companies who are eligible to bid to send large payloads to the surface of the Moon with the CLPS program.

On 8 April 2020, NASA selected Masten Space Systems for a mission to deliver and operate eight payloads – with nine science and technology instruments – to the Moon’s South Pole in 2022.

On 4 February 2021, NASA awarded a CLPS contract to Firefly Aerospace for a mission deliver a suite of 10 science investigations and technology demonstrations to the Moon in 2023.

On 21 July 2022, NASA announced that it had awarded a CLPS contract to Draper Laboratories.

Notes:

Payload selection
The CLPS contracts for landers and lander missions do not include the payloads themselves. The payloads are developed under separate contracts either at NASA facilities or in commercial facilities. The CLPS landers provide landing, support services, and sample return as specified in each individual contract.

The first batch of science payloads are being developed in NASA facilities, due to the short time available before the first planned flights. Subsequent selections include payloads provided by universities and industry. Calls for payloads are planned to be released each year for additional opportunities.

First batch
The first twelve NASA payloads and experiments were announced on February 21, 2019, and will fly on separate missions.  NASA as awarded contracts for four CLPS lander missions to support these payloads.

Linear Energy Transfer Spectrometer, to monitor the lunar surface radiation.
Magnetometer, to measure the surface magnetic field.
Low-frequency Radio Observations from the Near Side Lunar Surface, a radio experiment to measure photoelectron sheath density near the surface.
A set of three instruments to collect data during entry, descent and landing on the lunar surface to help develop future crewed landers.
Stereo Cameras for Lunar Plume-Surface Studies is a set of cameras for monitoring the interaction between the lander engine plume and the lunar surface.
Surface and Exosphere Alterations by Landers, another landing monitor to study the effects of spacecraft on the lunar exosphere.
Navigation Doppler Lidar for Precise Velocity and Range Sensing is a velocity and ranging lidar instrument designed to make lunar landings more precise.
Near-Infrared Volatile Spectrometer System, is an imaging spectrometer to analyze the composition of the lunar surface.
Neutron Spectrometer System and Advanced Neutron Measurements at the Lunar Surface, are a pair of neutron detectors to quantify the hydrogen -and therefore water near the surface.
Ion-Trap Mass Spectrometer for Lunar Surface Volatiles, is a mass spectrometer for measuring volatiles on the surface and in the exosphere.
Solar Cell Demonstration Platform for Enabling Long-Term Lunar Surface Power, a next-generation solar array for long-term missions.
Lunar Node 1 Navigation Demonstrator, a navigation beacon for providing geolocation for orbiters and landing craft.

Second batch
On July 1, 2019, NASA announced the selection of twelve additional payloads, provided by universities and industry. Seven of these are scientific investigations while five are technology demonstrations.

MoonRanger, a small, fast-moving rover that has the capability to drive beyond communications range with a lander and then return to it. Astrobotic Technology, Inc.
Heimdall, a flexible camera system for conducting lunar science on commercial vehicles. Planetary Science Institute.
Lunar Demonstration of a Reconfigurable, Radiation Tolerant Computer System, which will demonstrate a radiation-tolerant computing technology. Montana State University.
Regolith Adherence Characterization (RAC) Payload, which will determine how lunar regolith sticks to a range of materials exposed to the Moon's environment. Alpha Space Test and Research Alliance, LLC.
The Lunar Magnetotelluric Sounder, which will characterize the structure and composition of the Moon's mantle by studying electric and magnetic fields. Southwest Research Institute. Currently part of the Lunar Interior Temperature and Materials Suite planned for launch in 2024.
The Lunar Surface Electromagnetics Experiment (LuSEE), which will make comprehensive measurements of electromagnetic phenomena on the surface of the Moon. University of California, Berkeley.
The Lunar Environment heliospheric X-ray Imager (LEXI), which will capture images of the interaction of Earth's magnetosphere with solar wind. Boston University.
Next Generation Lunar Retroreflectors (NGLR), which will serve as a target for lasers on Earth to precisely measure the Earth-Moon distance. University of Maryland.
Lunar Compact InfraRed Imaging System (L-CIRiS), an infrared radiometer to explore the Moon's surface composition and temperature distribution. University of Colorado.
The Lunar Instrumentation for Subsurface Thermal Exploration with Rapidity (LISTER), an instrument designed to measure heat flow from the interior of the Moon. Texas Tech University. Currently part of the Lunar Interior Temperature and Materials Suite planned for launch in 2024.
PlanetVac, a technology for acquiring and transferring lunar regolith from the surface to other instruments or place it in a container for its potential return to Earth. Honeybee Robotics, Ltd.
SAMPLR: Sample Acquisition, Morphology Filtering, and Probing of Lunar Regolith, a sample acquisition technology that will make use of a robotic arm. Maxar Technologies.

Third batch
In June 2021, NASA announced the selection of three payloads from its Payloads and Research Investigations on the Surface of the Moon (PRISM) call for proposals. These payloads will be sent to Reiner Gamma and Schrödinger Basin in the 2023–2024 timeframe.

Lunar Vertex: a joint lander and rover payload suite slated for delivery to Reiner Gamma to investigate lunar swirls. Applied Physics Laboratory.
Farside Seismic Suite (FSS): two seismometers, the vertical Very Broadband seismometer and the Short Period sensor, will measure seismic activity on the far side of the Moon at Schrödinger Basin. Jet Propulsion Laboratory.
Lunar Interior Temperature and Materials Suite (LITMS): two instruments, the Lunar Instrumentation for Subsurface Thermal Exploration with Rapidity pneumatic drill and the Lunar Magnetotelluric Sounder, previously selected in the second batch and slated for delivery to Schrödinger Basin. Will complement data acquired by the FSS. Southwest Research Institute.

List of missions announced under CLPS

Missions contracted

Missions announced but not yet contracted

Orbit Beyond returned their task order (cancelling their mission) two months after award.

See also

References

External links
  Slides from the Industrial Day on May 8, 2018

 
Artemis program
Private spaceflight
NASA programs
Exploration of the Moon
2018 establishments in the United States